Masha Nazeem is an Indian inventor was born and brought up from Nagercoil in Kanniyakumari district. In 2005 during her eighth grade she designed a hi-tech train toilet (hygienic drainage disposal system in trains) that gained her two national and one international awards.

Personal life
Nazeem was born in 1993 and was raised in Nagercoil in the Kanniyakumari district of India. Nazeem's father worked at the Treasury Office in Kanyakumari.

Education 
Nazeem attended St. Joseph’s Convent Higher Secondary School before pursuing a B.E in Electronic and Electrical Engineering at SSN College of Engineering. She later obtained an M.Tech in Power Electronics in SRM University, Chennai.

Career
In 2006 at age 12, Nazeem was honoured at the Indian Science Congress in Hyderabad for her invention of a drainage system for railways. In 2015, Nazeem was selected for the Entrepreneurship Development Training Programme in the United States. The next year, Nazeem was invited to be a guest speaker at the 103rd Indian Science Conference.

Currently, Nazeem is an innovation lead in GEMS New Millennium School, United Arab Emirates.

Awards and honors
 2009 - IGNITE National Award (II Prize)
2010 - IGNITE National Award (I Prize)
2015 - Two National and an International award.
2016 - Chief Minister's State Youth Award (women's category)
 2018 - National Youth Award (from the Ministry of Youth Affairs and Sports) - for contributions to science and technology

Inventions
Transparent testing tool kit for students
"Mechanical porter" (a luggage carrying system on wheels)
Burglar alarm
Underground conveyor belt system for transporting school bags

Hygienic Drainage Disposal System 
After hearing a speech from the Railway Minister that warned officials may face punishment if the stench in railway systems was not dealt with, Nazeem invented a high-tech train toilet system. The Hygienic Drainage Disposal System was presented to several railway officials and India's then-president A. P. J. Abdul Kalam in 2005. Following Kalam's advice, Nazeem patented the invention.

Flameless seal-maker 
As a teenager, Nazeem witnessed her father melting lac over an open flame. Upon her realization that this was potentially dangerous, Nazeem sought to create a better way to safely heat lac for sealing. Nazeem invented and patented the flameless seal-maker that heats lac, wax or other seal-making materials using electricity. The flameless seal-maker was used at polling booths during the 2011 Assembly polls in Tamil Nadu.

Masha Innovation Center
In hometown setup Masha Innovation Center, a research laboratory and workshop, the main this for it is providing free hands on training to help the young inventors to make their ideas to reality, through this  Innovation Center she bring lot students ideas in to lime light and convert them in to inventors.

References

External links
 Official website

Indian Muslims
Engineers from Tamil Nadu
Indian Tamil academics
People from Kanyakumari district
1993 births
Living people